The 2021 NCAA Division II baseball tournament decided the champion of baseball at the NCAA Division II level for the 2021 season. the  won their first national championship in program history by defeating , who were playing in their third national championship. Head Coach Kyle Crookes won his first national championship in his tenure at Wingate. 
This tournament also introduced a Super Regional round to the tournament as the eight regionals were instead split into sixteen. Following which, the regional champions faced off in a best-of-three Super Regional. The winners of the super regionals would then advance to the College World Series.

Regionals

Atlantic Regional
Hosted by Charleston at Triana Field in Charleston, West Virginia.

Central Regional
Hosted by Central Missouri at Crane Stadium in Warrensburg, Missouri.

East Regional
Hosted by Franklin Pierce at Arthur and Martha Pappas Field in Rindge, New Hampshire.

Midwest Regional
Hosted by Lindenwood at Lou Brock Sports Complex in St. Charles, Missouri

South Regional
Hosted by West Florida at Jim Spooner Field in Pensacola, Florida.

Southeast Regional
Hosted by North Greenville at Ashmore Field in Tigerville, South Carolina.

South Central Regional
Hosted by Angelo State at Foster Field in San Angelo, Texas.

West Regional
Hosted by Northwest Nazarene at Elmore W. Vail Baseball Field in Nampa, Idaho.

Finals

Participants

Results

Bracket

Game results

References

 
NCAA Division II Baseball Tournament
NCAA Division II baseball tournament